Francis Walder, born Francis Waldburger  (5 August 1906 – 10 April 1997) was a Belgian writer and soldier. He was born in Brussels and died in Paris at the age of 90.

Life
He studied at the Royal Military Academy in Belgium.  During the World War II, he was a prisoner of war in Germany for five years. And he was a representative of the Belgian army that participated in diplomatic discussions after the Armistice. This experience will serve as a crucible for his work to come.  During his military career, he published only a few philosophical texts, ("Deep existence", "Seasons of the mind"), before devoting himself to writing after reaching retirement.

In 1958 he received the Prix Goncourt for Saint-Germain ou la négociation (Gallimard), an historical novel that recounts the negotiations between the crown of France and the Huguenots in 1570, negotiations leading to the fragile Peace of Saint-Germain-en-Laye.  This book deals with great subtlety with the entire diplomatic negotiations among the powerful.
He continued with the historical novel in two other novels: "A Letter for Hire" (Gallimard, 1962) whose work is in the seventeenth century and revived the courtier and poet Vincent Voiture and "Chaillot or co-existence" (Belfond, 1987) that shows the co-habitation policy of Louis XIII and Cardinal Richelieu in counterpoint to the co-existence of Cardinal and Gaston, Duke of Orléans, brother of the King. His novels, meticulous style, often tinged with pessimism and are haunted by the specter of the impossible love between persons of different origin or social status.

Works
 L'existence profonde (essays) 1953
 Les saisons de l'esprit (essays) Aubier, 1955
 Saint-Germain ou la négociation Gallimard, 1958
 Cendre et or, Gallimard, 1959
 Une lettre de Voiture, Gallimard, 1962
 Chaillot ou la coexistence P. Belfond, 1987, 
 Le hasard est un grand artiste P. Belfond, 1991, 

English Translations
 The negotiators'', McDowell, Obolensky, 1959

External links
"Principales commémorations nationales, anniversaires, rencontres et célébrations culturelles, artistiques ou littéraires prévues pour l'année 2007", La République des Lettres

1906 births
1997 deaths
Belgian essayists
Writers from Brussels
Belgian writers in French
Prix Goncourt winners
20th-century Belgian writers
20th-century essayists
20th-century Belgian male writers
Belgian prisoners of war in World War II
World War II prisoners of war held by Germany
Belgian military personnel of World War II
Royal Military Academy (Belgium) alumni